Thumathoides is a genus of moths in the subfamily Arctiinae. It contains the single species Thumathoides fumosa, which is found in New Caledonia.

References

Natural History Museum Lepidoptera generic names catalog

Arctiinae